The 2018 Haringey Council election took place on 3 May 2018 to elect members of Haringey Council in England. This was on the same day as other local elections.

Summary of results

Ward results 

Voting results sourced from Haringey Votes.

Alexandra

Bounds Green

Pat Berryman was a sitting councillor in Fortis Green ward

David Beacham was a sitting councillor in Alexandra ward

Bruce Grove

Crouch End

Fortis Green

Harringay

Highgate

Hornsey

Muswell Hill

Noel Park

Emine Ibrahim was a sitting councillor in Harringay ward

Northumberland Park

Clive Carter was a sitting councillor in Highgate ward

Seven Sisters

Barbara Blake was a sitting councillor for St Ann's ward.

St Ann's

Stroud Green

Tottenham Green

Tottenham Hale

West Green

White Hart Lane

Woodside

Mark Blake was a sitting councillor in Muswell Hill ward

By-elections 
A by-election was held in West Green ward on 13 December 2018 following the resignation of Ishmael Osamor.

References

2018 London Borough council elections
2018